Justice is a 1914 British silent crime film directed by Frank Wilson and starring Alec Worcester, Alma Taylor and Stewart Rome.

Cast
 Alec Worcester as Jack Raynor  
 Alma Taylor as Nan Prescott 
 Stewart Rome as Paul Meredith 
 Harry Royston as Joe Prescott  
 Ruby Belasco as Mrs. Prescott  
 Jamie Darling as John Meredith  
 Marie de Solla as Mrs. Meredith

References

Bibliography
 Palmer, Scott. British Film Actors' Credits, 1895-1987. McFarland, 1988.

External links

1914 films
1910s crime films
British crime films
British silent feature films
Films directed by Frank Wilson
Hepworth Pictures films
British black-and-white films
1910s English-language films
1910s British films